The Anugerah Musik Indonesia ( 'Indonesian Music Awards'), also known as AMI or colloquially AMI Awards, is an annual Indonesian music award ceremony to recognize outstanding achievements in improving the quality and quantity of artists in the mainly Indonesian-language music industry. It has been compared to the American Grammy Awards and British Brit Awards. It provides recognition of the music industry similarly as other entertainment awards such as the Panasonic Gobel Awards (television) and Festival Film Indonesia (motion pictures).

History
The awards were formalized as the Indonesian Music Awards in 1997 as a joint project between ASIRI (Recording Industry Association of Indonesia), PAPPRI (Singers, Songwriters, and Music Record Producers Association of Indonesia), and KCI (Copyright Office of Indonesia).

Organization
Each of the three founding organizations originally contributed one board member, under the direction of Indonesian country singer Tantowi Yahya. Under this board was another, less powerful board. Afterwards, further divisions were added based on specialization, including Marketing, Communication, and Membership. In 2016, jazz musician Dwiki Dharmawan replaced Yahya as chairman.

Award categories
The Anugerah Musik Indonesia awards are issued in several categories, each of which isolates a specific contribution to music. Anugerah Musik Indonesia (AMI) categories have been added and removed over time. The 2010 awards had 35 categories, while the 2011 awards had 46. The categories increased to 49 in 2017.

The general awards include several awards not restricted by musical genre:
 "Best of the Best Newcomer" is awarded to a promising breakthrough performer.
 "Best of the Best Album" is awarded to the performer and the production team of a full album.
 "Best of the Best Production Work" is awarded to the writer(s)/composer(s) of a song and also the performer.

Other awards are given to performances and production in different musical genres, as well as for other contributions such as artwork. The Anugerah Musik Indonesia also presents special awards given for longer-lasting contributions to the Indonesian music industry such as AMI Legend Award and Lifetime Achievement Award (which is not presented every year).

List of categories
As of 2018
General
 Best Album
 Best Production Work
 Best Newcomer

Pop

 Best Pop Female Solo Artist
 Best Pop Male Solo Artist
 Best Pop Duo/Group/Vocal Group/Collaboration
 Best Pop Songwriting
 Best Pop Production
 Best Pop Album

Rock
 Best Rock Female/Male/Instrumental Solo Artist
 Best Rock Duo/Group/Vocal/Collaboration
 Best Rock Album

Jazz
 Best Jazz Vocal Artist
 Best Jazz Instrumental Artist
 Best Jazz Album

R&B
 Best Male/Female Solo Artist
 Best R&B Duo/Group/Vocal/Collaboration

Dangdut

 Best Dangdut Male/Female Solo Artist
 Best Contemporary Dangdut Male/Female Solo Artist
 Best Dangdut Duo/Group/Dangdut/Dangdut Collaboration
 Best Dangdut Songwriting
 Best Dangdut Production

Children's music

 Best Children's Music Male/Female Solo Artist
 Best Children's Music Duo/Group/Vocal/Collaboration
 Best Children's Music Songwriting
 Best Children's Music Production

Production work

 Best Keroncong/Contemporary Keroncong/Langgam/Stambul Production Work
 Best Alternative Production Work
 Best Metal/Hardcore Production Work
 Best Rap/Hip-hop Production Work
 Best Reggae/Ska/Rocksteady Production Work
 Best Collaborative Production Work
 Best Original Soundtrack Production Work
 Best Vocal Group Production Work
 Best Regional Language Song Production Work
 Best Islamic Music Production Work
 Best Christian Music Production Work
 Best Instrumental Production Work
 Best Dance Production Work
 Best Electronica Production Work
 Best Progressive Production Work
 Best Folk/Country/Ballad Production Work
 Best Urban Production Work
 Best World Music Production Work

Technical
 Best Production Arrangement Work
 Best Production Support Work
 Best Graphic Album Design
 Best Production Team

List of ceremonies
 1st Annual Anugerah Musik Indonesia
 2nd Annual Anugerah Musik Indonesia
 3rd Annual Anugerah Musik Indonesia
 4th Annual Anugerah Musik Indonesia
 5th Annual Anugerah Musik Indonesia
 6th Annual Anugerah Musik Indonesia
 7th Annual Anugerah Musik Indonesia
 8th Annual Anugerah Musik Indonesia
 9th Annual Anugerah Musik Indonesia
 10th Annual Anugerah Musik Indonesia
 11th Annual Anugerah Musik Indonesia
 12th Annual Anugerah Musik Indonesia
 13th Annual Anugerah Musik Indonesia
 14th Annual Anugerah Musik Indonesia
 15th Annual Anugerah Musik Indonesia
 16th Annual Anugerah Musik Indonesia
 17th Annual Anugerah Musik Indonesia
 18th Annual Anugerah Musik Indonesia
 19th Annual Anugerah Musik Indonesia
 20th Annual Anugerah Musik Indonesia
 21st Annual Anugerah Musik Indonesia
 22nd Annual Anugerah Musik Indonesia
 23rd Annual Anugerah Musik Indonesia

Reception
The Beat describes the AMIs as "The Grammys a la Indonesia".

See also
 Grammy Awards, the American equivalent
 Brit Awards, the British equivalent
 Music of Indonesia

References

External links
 

 
 
Awards established in 1997